In American folklore, Champ or Champy is the name of a lake monster said to live in Lake Champlain, a -long body of fresh water shared by New York and Vermont, with a portion extending into Quebec, Canada. The legend of the monster is considered a draw for tourism in the Burlington, Vermont and Plattsburgh, New York areas.

History of the legend 
Over the years, there have been over 300 reported sightings of Champ.

The original story is related to Iroquois legends of giant snakes, which the Mohawk named Onyare’kowa.

French cartographer Samuel de Champlain, the founder of Québec and the lake's namesake, is often claimed to be the first European to have sighted Champ, in 1609. However, this legend dates back to a fake quote published in the Summer 1970 issue of Vermont Life. In the Vermont Life article, Champlain is alleged to have documented a "20-foot serpent thick as a barrel, and a head like a horse." This quote has often been repeated, but is in fact apocryphal. Champlain did document large fish:

The 1878 translation of his journals clarifies that Chaoufaou refers to gar (or gar pike), specifically Lepisosteus osseus (the longnose gar).

An 1819 report in the Plattsburgh Republican, entitled "Cape Ann Serpent on Lake Champlain", reports a "Capt. Crum" sighting an enormous serpentine monster. Crum estimated the monster to have been about 187 feet long and approximately two hundred yards away from him. Despite the great distance, he claimed to have witnessed it being followed by "two large Sturgeon and a Bill-fish" and was able to see that it had three teeth and eyes the color of peeled onions. He also described the monster as having "a belt of red" around its neck and a white star on its forehead.

In 1883, Sheriff Nathan H. Mooney claimed that he had seen a water serpent about "20 rods" (the equivalent of 110 yards in length) from where he was on the shore. He claimed that he was so close that he could see "round white spots inside its mouth" and that "the creature appeared to be about 25 to 30 feet in length". Mooney's sighting led to many more alleged eyewitnesses coming forward with their own accounts of Champ.

The legend of Champ captured the interest of P. T. Barnum, and in 1873 and 1887, the famous showman offered rewards for anyone who could bring him the monster.

Mansi photograph 
In 1977, Sandra Mansi took a photograph while on vacation with her family that appears to show the dinosaur with his head out of the lake. According to Joe Nickell, it is unlikely that a giant creature could swim, let alone hide, in such shallow water. It has been suggested that the object in the photograph could possibly be a rising tree trunk or log.
 In the book The Untold Story of Champ by Robert E. Bartholomew, it is further revealed that the original photo was sent to Philip Reines, a nautical expert at the State University of New York at Plattsburgh, so that he could examine and hopefully authenticate it.  Reines quickly realized that the two most vital elements in verifying the photo were missing. Sandra Mansi said that she had thrown away the negative, and that she could not locate where she snapped the photo. Without the negative or location it was impossible to determine with any degree of certainty what was in the photo. Possessing the negative would allow the image to be magnified to see greater detail, while knowing the location could reveal important clues such as the object’s size and distance, and whether the photo was even taken on Lake Champlain. Reines could not authenticate the photo and the story behind it led to big questions and potential red flags detailed in his book.

Recent reports 
Champ reportedly can be seen in a video taken by fishermen Dick Affolter and his stepson Pete Bodette in the summer of 2005. Close examination of the images may be interpreted either as a head and neck of a plesiosaur-like animal and even an open mouth in one frame and a closed mouth in another; or as a fish or eel. Although two retired FBI forensic image analysts, who reviewed the tape, said it appears authentic and unmanipulated, one of them added that "there's no place in there that I can actually see an animal or any other object on the surface".

One piece of evidence, though not a "sighting" per se, is the recording of sounds from within the lake by the Fauna Communications Research Institute in 2003, working as part of a Discovery Channel program. The group described the sounds as being similar to those produced by Beluga whales or dolphins—neither of which are known to live in Lake Champlain. An article describing the recordings has been published to scientific literature. Based upon appearance and "mysterious alligatorlike tracks" found near Lake Champlain, cryptozoologists Katy Elizabeth and Dennis Hall suggested in 2016 that "Champ" could be a member of the family Crocodylidae (crocodiles). Researcher Scott Mardis explains that the tracks were likely the tracks of a large snapping turtle and also mentions the longnose gar or the lake sturgeon as more probable candidates for "Champ."

Cultural importance to New York and Vermont 

The Champ legend has become a revenue-generating attraction. For example, the village of Port Henry, New York, has erected a giant model of Champ and holds "Champ Day" on the first Saturday of every August. As the mascot of Vermont's baseball team, the Vermont Lake Monsters, Champ became more prominent after the team was renamed from the Vermont Expos following the 2005 season. Champ has been the primary attraction of the former Minor League Baseball team since their inception, and continues to serve as the Futures Collegiate Baseball League team's mascot. This mascot version of Champ appears as a special guest at various charitable and other functions throughout Vermont. Several nearby establishments, including a car wash, use images of Champ as a logo. In 2022, it was reported that a feature dramatic film, Lucy and the Lake Monster, was in the works about a young orphan girl and her grandfather looking for Champ. The production filmed in Port Henry, New York and in various locations around Lake Champlain's Bulwagga Bay in July and August, 2022.

See also
Mussie
Lake Tianchi Monster
Ogopogo
Loch Ness Monster
Mokele mbembe
Selma (lake monster)
Memphre

References 

New Information On Mansi Photo

External links
Lake Champlain Region page about Champ, the Lake Champlain Monster

American legendary creatures
Lake Champlain
Sports mascots
Vermont folklore
Water monsters
Cryptids